Hall Ravenscroft (c. 1600 – c. 1673) was an English politician who sat in the House of Commons at various times between 1640 and 1660.

Ravenscroft was the son of John Ravenscroft of Horsham, Sussex and his wife Judith Ferne, daughter of George Ferne. He matriculated at Christ Church, Oxford on 8 November 1616 and was a student of Lincoln's Inn in 1618.

In April 1640, Ravenscroft was elected Member of Parliament for Horsham in the Short Parliament. He was re-elected MP for Horsham in November 1640 for the Long Parliament and survived Pride's Purge to sit in the Rump Parliament until 1653.
 
In May 1659 the Rump Parliament sat again and in 1660 Ravenscroft was re-elected MP for Horsham in the Convention Parliament.

Ravenscroft married Eliza Stapley, daughter of John Stapley of Hickstead in the parish of Twineham, Sussex. Their only child was a daughter Elizabeth  who married Thomas Delves, son of Sir Henry Delves, 2nd Baronet.

References

 

1600s births
1670s deaths
English MPs 1640 (April)
English MPs 1640–1648
English MPs 1648–1653
English MPs 1660